Carn Chuinneag (839 m) is a mountain in the Northwest Highlands of Scotland, south of Strathcarron in Sutherland.

A distinct twin-summited peak, it lies in a little visited but attractive corner of the Highlands. The nearest village is Ardgay

References

Mountains and hills of the Northwest Highlands
Marilyns of Scotland
Corbetts